Petersville Australia Limited was an Australian food producer.

History

Petersville was founded in 1961 when Edgell and Peters Ice Cream merged. In May 1981, H.C. Sleigh Co. launched a successful takeover offer and rebranded the company Petersville Sleigh. In 1982, it was taken over by the Adelaide Steamship Company. In October 1991 it was purchased by Pacific Dunlop.

Some of the foods it produced or distributed were: ice cream, yogurt, cheese, butter and imported cheeses. Its head office (now Nestle Australia's) was in Wellington Road, Mulgrave, Victoria, which was itself known as Petersville.

Among its brand names were Peters Ice Cream, Four'n Twenty, Edgell and Birds Eye.   

Petersville had dairy production plants at Warragul, Trafalgar and Yarragon in Victoria and at Orange, Taree and Grafton in New South Wales.

References

Adelaide Steamship Company
Companies based in Melbourne
Companies formerly listed on the Australian Securities Exchange
Food and drink companies of Australia
1961 establishments in Australia